Allensburg is an unincorporated community in Highland County, in the U.S. state of Ohio.

History
Allensburg was platted in 1839, and named after William Allen, a politician who served as the 31st governor of Ohio. A post office called Allensburgh was established in 1843, and remained in operation until 1864.

References

Unincorporated communities in Highland County, Ohio
Unincorporated communities in Ohio